Solomon Markovich Herzenstein (1854 – August 7, 1894) was a Russian zoologist.

Biography
Herzenstein received a degree in natural sciences and mathematics from St. Petersburg University and was appointed as the custodian of the Zoological Museum of the Imperial Academy of Science in 1879 or 1880.  He also supervised practical training at the University for Women. In 1880, 1884, and 1887, he was commissioned to travel to the Murman Coast of the Kola Peninsula to study the mollusks and fishes there.

He co-wrote Zamyetki po Ikhtologii Basseina Ryeki Amura (1887) and Nauchnye Rezultaty Puteshestvi Przevalskavo (1888–91) with N. L. Varpakhovski.

Species described

 Acanthogobio guentheri (Herzenstein, 1892)
 Gymnocypris potanini (Herzenstein, 1891)
 Triplophysa alticeps (Herzenstein, 1888)
 Triplophysa brachyptera (Herzenstein, 1888)
 Triplophysa brevicauda (Herzenstein, 1888)
 Triplophysa chondrostoma (Herzenstein, 1888)
 Triplophysa crassicauda (Herzenstein, 1888)
 Triplophysa incipiens (Herzenstein, 1888)
 Triplophysa leptosoma (Herzenstein, 1888)
 Triplophysa macropterus (Herzenstein, 1888)
 Triplophysa orientalis (Herzenstein, 1888)
 Triplophysa scleroptera (Herzenstein, 1888)
 Triplophysa siluroides (Herzenstein, 1888)
 Triplophysa stenura (Herzenstein, 1888)

Tribute
 Gnathopogon herzensteini (Günther, 1896) was probably named in honor of Herzenstein, who named an Acanthogobio after Günther in 1892.
 Asprocottus herzensteini (L. S. Berg, 1906), the Herzenstein's rough sculpin.

References
 

1854 births
1894 deaths
19th-century Jews from the Russian Empire
Russian zoologists
Russian ichthyologists
Scientists from Saint Petersburg
Saint Petersburg State University alumni